Harbinger Down (also known as Inanimate in the United Kingdom) is a 2015 American independent science-fiction monster horror film written and directed by Alec Gillis and produced by Tom Woodruff Jr., the founders of the special effects company StudioADI, and starring Lance Henriksen.

The film follows a group of graduate students aboard the crabbing trawler Harbinger who are studying the effects of global warming on a pod of Belugas in the Bering Sea. They recover a crashed Soviet spacecraft encased in a block of ice that is apparently virulently infected with tardigrades, and after thawing, they are attacked by shapeshifting alien monsters.

Funded by fan donations through Kickstarter, the film predominantly features practical creature effects created by ADI, including animatronics, prosthetic makeup, stop motion and miniature effects. Computer generated imagery was used only to enhance these effects (such as digitally erasing control wires and gimbals).

Plot
In 1982, a Soviet moon lander crashes into the Bering Sea. In 2015, two biology graduate students, Ronelle and Sadie join their professor, Stephen, on an experimental tour to study the effects of global warming on whales. Sadie's grandfather, Graff, takes them to sea in his commercial fishing trawler, Harbinger, which is crewed by Bowman, Roland, Big G, Dock, Svetlana and Atka. Sadie declines when Graff encourages her to helm the boat as she has lost her nerve since losing her father at sea. After meeting the crew, Sadie, Ronelle and Stephen go to sleep.

That night, Sadie wakes as the crew catch a load of crab. Detecting that there is whale activity in the area, Sadie unsuccessfully attempts to wake the others, then investigates on her own. With sonar equipment she finds something large under the ice. The crew help to recover what proves to be the crashed Soviet lander, now frozen in ice. Ronelle and Stephen are awakened by the commotion and Stephen excitedly claims ownership of the lander. Graff disputes his claim and says the Russians will want their ship back. Sadie points out that the object was the property of the now-nonexistent Soviet Union, therefore maritime salvage law would give them the rights to it. Graff infuriates Stephen further by declaring that it belongs to Sadie. Ronelle tries to contact her sister Tamara to tell her about what they found to no avail.

Bowman encourages Sadie to investigate the moon lander before Stephen can find a way to claim it for himself. Bowman recruits Big G to distract Stephen while Sadie sneaks off. Sadie discovers that the Soviet cosmonaut died of an unknown infection and takes a skin sample to analyze. Stephen becomes further frustrated when he learns she has examined the spacecraft before him. He threatens to destroy her career unless she signs over the discovery to him.  Graff threatens to take the issue to the courts but Sadie gives in. Meanwhile, Sadie learns that the moon lander was carrying tardigrades, a hardy terrestrial life-form that can survive in extreme conditions. However, cosmic radiation has caused them to mutate and become capable of shapeshifting.

When the cosmonaut's body goes missing, Stephen accuses Sadie of moving or hiding it. She denies this and Bowman defends her. When Stephen becomes belligerent, Graff threatens him. While examining the lander, Stephen becomes contaminated with the mutated tardigrades, and the cosmonaut's body kills Roland. Sadie finds Stephen on deck complaining that he can't breathe and sees him stripping his clothes off despite the sub-zero temperatures. The others drag him back in, after which several stalks sprout from his back and spray the area with a strange, dark liquid. Dock is sprayed in his mouth but Sadie confirms that they are all potentially contaminated. They make the liquid nitrogen portable by putting it into a scuba tank and proceed to freeze Stephen's body and the lander.

When Dock begins to show signs of infection Svetlana locks him in a cage above deck in order to incinerate him using a flare gun. The others object to the plan until Dock also sprouts tentacle-like growths. The tardigrades cut the ship's power, demonstrating high intelligence, but the backup battery kicks in. As they work to restore it, the organism kills Atka, during which Svetlana is revealed to be a Russian spy. Holding Sadie, Bowman, Big G, Ronelle and Graff hostage, she explains that the tardigrades were part of a Soviet experiment to create radiation-resistant cosmonauts. She does not want to reclaim the Soviet moon lander but instead intends to sink the boat after being picked up by a nearby Russian submarine. Before she can kill her hostages, however, the organism attacks, causing Svetlana to lose her gun. Ronelle picks up the gun, but is grabbed by the creature and pulled through a small pipe. When Svetlana tries to reason with the others, she too is grabbed by the creature and dragged off.

The survivors Graff, Sadie, Bowman and Big G search for several explosive charges that Svetlana has hidden throughout the boat. The last four are hidden in the bilge, a tight area which only Sadie has access to. As she collects the explosives, the others discover that the tardigrades have consumed and absorbed their latest catch, two tons of crab. As they call down to warn Sadie, she realizes she is standing amid the tardigrades. Although she escapes, Graff is infected. He instructs Big G to restart the boat and Sadie to pilot it before asking Bowman to kill him.

Big G restarts the ship but dies after battling Svetlana's shape-shifted and mutated body. Before Bowman can freeze Graff with the liquid nitrogen, Bowman is impaled by the creature. Graff, fighting the creature, instructs Sadie to scuttle the boat and save herself. She steers it toward an iceberg and escapes just as the creature bursts through the deck. Via the portable radio, the US Coast Guard alerts her that a rescue helicopter is in her vicinity. The helicopter can be heard approaching as Sadie lies motionless on the ice.

Cast
Lance Henriksen as Graff
Giovonnie Samuels as Ronelle
Matt Winston as Stephen
Camille Balsamo as  Sadie
Reid Collums as Bowman
Mike Estime as Dock
Milla Bjorn as Svetlana
Winston James Francis as Big G
Jason Speer as Sergei
Edwin H. Bravo as Atka
Sean Serino as Tamara
Morgana Ignis as Tardigrade 
Kraig W. Sturtz as Roland

Production

Background
{| class="toccolours" style="float: right; margin-left: 1em; margin-right: 2em; font-size: 85%; background:#c6dbf7; color:black; width:30em; max-width: 40%;" cellspacing="5"
| style="text-align: left;" | "We looked at that and said, 'There are still people who like what we do!' because we had been getting beaten up a bit over the last five or six years in feature films. So we decided to put up a couple of other videos, like our Green Goblin test makeup for the first Spider-Man film, and that video got an even bigger fan response than The Thing did, so we thought, 'Well, maybe people would be interested in our work for Ridley Scott's I Am Legend''', and again, there was another big outpouring of, 'Why didn’t they use makeups like that instead of the digital characters they used?'"
|-
| style="text-align: right;" | — Alec Gillis describing the Internet's response to the behind-the-scenes videos of their special effects.
|}

In 2010, Amalgamated Dynamics was hired by Universal Studios to create the practical special effects for the 2011 The Thing prequel. However, before the film was released, the majority of ADI's effects work on the film was digitally replaced in post production by computer-generated imagery. This decision was upsetting to the crew of Amalgamated Dynamics, as this was not the first film of theirs where they later found their work replaced.

After the release of The Thing, in response to fan queries about what became of ADI's effects for the film, Alec Gillis and Tom Woodruff Jr. uploaded a behind-the-scenes video to YouTube which showcased their original practical effects prior to their replacement. According to Gillis and Woodruff, the video received such an overwhelmingly positive response that it inspired them to use their official YouTube Channel to feature their archived videos of creature effects from throughout their career.  Gillis said that it was the tipping point that prompted them to go ahead with their dream of producing their own film. "Honestly, we were resistant to it at first, so it wasn't until I looked around my shop and saw an empty facility that I realized we were actually at the mercy of studios that didn't actually care about our techniques anymore. They view it as a commodity and a product, and they've corporatized the structure of creating art and in the end it all becomes disposable. That's not how the fans see our work."

The film's in-story events open on June 25, 1982, a tribute to the release date of John Carpenter's The Thing.

Kickstarter campaign
On May 8, 2013, Alec Gillis began a Kickstarter drive for Harbinger Down, advertising the film as being a monster horror film that was, "in the spirit of two of the greatest sci-fi/horror films of all time, ALIEN and THE THING", and that would feature only practical techniques to create the film's monsters, including the use of animatronics, prosthetic makeup, stop motion and miniature effects, with the film's creatures featuring no digital animation outside of rod/rig removal and digital compositing. With a budget goal of $350,000, the film would have Lance Henriksen attached to star, composers Joel McNeely and Michael Larrabee creating the musical score, and would also feature the efforts of Oscar-nominated model builders Pat McClung, Robert Skotak and Dennis Skotak.

By 7 June 2013, Amalgamated Dynamics funded Harbinger Down, making it the most successfully funded sci-fi/horror project in Kickstarter history, at $384,181. Gillis stated that while the money raised by the campaign would be sufficient to fund the "nuts and bolts" of the film, the film's special effects would have to be created at Gillis and Woodruff's own expense due to the film's low budget. The success of the Kickstarter campaign went on to draw the attention of producer Sultan Saeed Al Darmaki, who provided additional funding for the film through his company Dark Dunes Productions.

Principal photography
Principal photography began on January 27, 2014. The cast includes Lance Henriksen, Giovonnie Samuels, Camille Balsamo, Reid Collums, and Matt Winston.

ReceptionHarbinger Down was poorly  received by critics. The review aggregator website Rotten Tomatoes reported that 38% of critics have given the film a positive review based on 8 reviews, with an average rating of 3.80 out of 10.

Joe Leydon of Variety'' gave the film moderate praise, writing, "Made by and for aficionados of '80s-era sci-fi/horror thrillers, 'Harbinger Down' ranks somewhere between self-consciously cheesy SyFy Channel fare and better-than-average direct-to-video product in terms of production values, performance levels and overall ability to sustain interest while generating suspense. Theatrical exposure will be fleeting, but this small-budget, high-concept trifle could attract home-screen traffic if favorable word of mouth is sparked by the enthusiasm of genre-friendly websites and bloggers."

References

External links

 
 
 HARBINGER DOWN : A Practical Creature FX Film, Kickstarter page.
  09-06-2014

2015 films
2015 horror films
American monster movies
American science fiction horror films
2010s science fiction horror films
American action horror films
2010s English-language films
Films about shapeshifting
American independent films
2010s monster movies
Films set in 1982
Films set in 2015
Kickstarter-funded films
2010s American films